Abdoun is a residential area of Amman, Jordan. Abdoun is considered by many to be the most affluent district of the city, and is located towards the south of the city. Some of Jordan's most expensive real estate is located in the district.

Abdoun Circle is surrounded by numerous restaurants, cafés and stalls, and is a popular spot among Amman's youth. Abdoun Mall, the first mall to open in Amman at the time of its opening, is also located in the district.

Abdoun is neighbored by the districts of Deir Ghbar, Sweifieh, Jabal Al-Akhdar, Al-Hilal, Al-Yasmin, and Jabal Amman. The Abdoun Bridge connects the 4th Circle in Jabal Amman to the Abdoun Circle and a highway continues through Abdoun and into south Amman.

Neighbourhoods of Amman